(German for "mouse tooth") is a fast network traffic generator written in C which allows the user to craft nearly every possible and "impossible" packet. Since version 0.31 Mausezahn is open source in terms of the GPLv2. Herbert Haas, the original developer of Mausezahn, died on 25 June 2011. The project has been incorporated into the netsniff-ng toolkit, and continues to be developed there.

Typical applications of Mausezahn include:

 Testing or stressing IP multicast networks
 Penetration testing of firewalls and IDS
 Finding weaknesses in network software or appliances
 Creation of malformed packets to verify whether a system processes a given protocol correctly
 Didactical demonstrations as lab utility

Mausezahn allows sending an arbitrary sequence of bytes directly out of the network interface card. An integrated
packet builder provides a simple command line interface for more complicated packets. Since version 0.38, Mausezahn offers a multi-threaded mode with Cisco-style command line interface.

Features 

As of version 0.38 Mausezahn supports the following features:

 Jitter measurement via Real-time Transport Protocol (RTP) packets
 VLAN tagging (arbitrary number of tags)
 MPLS label stacks (arbitrary number of labels)
 BPDU packets as used by the Spanning Tree Protocol (PVST+ is also supported)
 Cisco Discovery Protocol messages
 Link Layer Discovery Protocol messages
 IGMP version 1 and 2 query and report messages
 DNS messages
 ARP messages
 IP, UDP, and TCP header creation
 ICMP packets 
 Syslog messages
 Address, port, and TCP sequence number sweeps
 Random MAC or IP addresses, FQDN addresses
 A very high packet transmission rate (approximately 100,000 packets per second)

Mausezahn only sends exactly the packet the user has specified. Therefore, it is rather less suited for vulnerability audits where additional algorithms are required to detect open ports behind a firewall and to automatically evade intrusion detection systems (IDS). However, a network administrator could implement audit routines via a script that utilizes Mausezahn for creating the actual packets.

Platforms 

Mausezahn currently runs only on Linux systems and there are no plans to port it to the Windows operating system.

See also
 Traffic generation model
 Nessus
 Nmap

References

External links 

Official/new website

Computer security software
Free network management software
Linux-only free software
Free software programmed in C